The Euskirchen court shooting was an act of mass murder that occurred at the district court in Euskirchen, Germany on March 9, 1994. Just after his appeal against a sentence for assaulting his former girlfriend, Vera Lamesic, had ended with an upholding of his conviction, 39-year-old Erwin Mikolajczyk re-entered the court building armed with .45-caliber Colt pistol and a homemade bomb in a backpack. In the hallway he approached Lamesic, hugged her, then fatally shot her, two women who had accompanied her, as well as two other people, and then entered the court room where he killed 33-year-old Alexander Schäfer, the judge who had convicted him. When he ran out of ammunition, Mikolajczyk killed himself by detonating the bomb. A total of eight people were also wounded in the attack.

Victims

Peter Kurth
Vera Lamesic, 56
Agnes Müller
Peter Preuß
Marianne Rübsam
Alexander Schäfer, 33

In popular culture
The film , released the same year and starring Christoph Waltz as Erwin Mikolajczyk, is based on the incident.

References

External links
 Tödlicher Aufschub, Focus (11/1994)
 Schlimmes passiert, Der Spiegel (11/1994)
 Bei dem Anschlag sterben sieben Menschen, General-Anzeiger (March 8, 2004)
 Amoklauf im Amtsgericht, Kölner Stadt-Anzeiger (March 8, 2009)
 Germany - Courtroom shootout, Associated Press (March 10, 1994) (Video)

Euskirchen
Explosions in 1994
Mass murder in 1994
1994 murders in Germany
Suicide bombings in Germany
Deaths by firearm in Germany
Mass shootings in Germany
Murder–suicides in Germany
Spree shootings in Germany
1990s in North Rhine-Westphalia
Crime in North Rhine-Westphalia
March 1994 events in Europe
Attacks on buildings and structures in Germany
1994 mass shootings in Europe
Building bombings in Germany